Herbert William Hawthorne (17 December 1943 – 14 April 1972) was a New Zealand racing driver. He was born in Derryhennett, County Armagh, Northern Ireland and immigrated to New Zealand at 13 years of age.

Racing career 
Hawthorne started racing in the mid-to-late 1960s with a Ford Anglia. He moved to the United Kingdom to work as a racing mechanic at Ron Tauranac's Brabham factory. He built a Brabham BT21 and shipped it back to New Zealand where he raced it in the National Formula category for twin-cam, 1600 cm3 engines. He became friends with Allan McCall, who was impressed with Hawthorne's racing talent.

Hawthorne returned to the UK with a limited budget to race in Formula 3, then went to the US to race in the North American Formula B/Atlantic Championship where he became vice-champion of the series in 1971.

In 1972 Hawthorne won the Bogota Grand Prix, giving the Brabham BT38 its maiden victory. He did not continue with Brabham but linked up again with McCall, who was developing Formula 2 under the banner "Leda Engineering".

Hawthorne's first Formula 2 race was the Jochen Rindt Memorial Trophy at Thruxton, a round of both the British and European Formula 2 Championships. Hawthorne won a heat race and was putting on an impressive display in the final race before retiring on lap 38 with a fuel pickup problem.

Death 

Hawthorne was killed on 14 April 1972 in the following round of the European Championship, the Jim Clark Memorial Race at Hockenheim.  Hawthorne was driving Allan McCall's TUI car, racing with German driver Bernd Terbeck when Hawthorne's car slowed. Terbeck hit Hawthorne's car at speed, pitching it head-on against the barriers. The car skidded along the guard-rail, pulling out security uprights and came to rest on fire. At the track it was realised that both Terbeck and Hawthorne were missing, but there was no knowledge of the incident until two laps later, when Niki Lauda pulled in to the pits and asked why nothing was being done about a car on fire on the circuit. It was later confirmed that Hawthorne had died instantly from head injuries.

References

1944 births
1972 deaths
New Zealand racing drivers
Racing drivers who died while racing
Sport deaths in Germany
New Zealand people of Irish descent
People from County Armagh
Tasman Series drivers